An online dating application is an online dating service presented through a mobile phone application (app), often taking advantage of a smartphone's GPS location capabilities, always on-hand presence, easy access to digital photo galleries and mobile wallets to enhance the traditional nature of online dating. These apps aim to simplify and speed up the process of sifting through potential dating partners, chatting, flirting, and potentially meeting or becoming romantically involved over traditional online dating services.

The launch of the Tinder dating app in 2012 led to a growth of online dating applications, by both new providers and traditional online dating services that expanded into the mobile app market. Online dating apps are now mainstream in the U.S. As of 2017, online dating is the number one method by which new couples in the U.S. meet. The percentage of couples meeting online is predicted to increase to 70% by 2040.

Origins 
Tinder was the application that led the surge in mobile dating applications. Tinder was released in September 12, 2012 by founders Sean Rad, Jonathan Badeen, Justin Mateen, Joe Munoz, Dinesh Moorjani, Chris Gylczynski, and Whitney Wolfe. Although, other sources state that the founders are Mateen, Rad, and Badeen only.

Usage by demographic group 
Online dating applications typically target a younger demographic group. Today almost 50% of people know of someone who use the services or has met their loved one through the service. After the iPhone launch in 2007, online dating data has mushroomed as application usage increased. In 2005, only 10% of 18-24 year olds reported to have used online dating services; this number quickly grew to over 27%,  making this target demographic the largest number of users for most applications. When Pew Research Center conducted a study in 2016, they found that 59% of U.S. adults agreed that online dating is a good way to meet people compared to 44% in 2005. This explosion in usage can be explained by the increased use of smartphones. By the end of 2022, it is expected there will be 413 million active users of online dating services worldwide.

The increased use of smartphones by those 65 and older has also driven that population to the use dating apps. The Pew Research Center found that usage increase by 8 points since last surveyed in 2012. A study in 2021 found that more than one-third of seniors have dated in the past 5 years, and roughly one-third of those dating seniors have turned to dating apps.

During the COVID-19 pandemic, Morning Consult found that more Americans were using online dating apps than ever before. In one survey in April 2020, the company discovered that 53% of U.S. adults who use online dating apps have been using them more during the pandemic. As of February 2021, that share increased to 71 percent.

Research using Hofstede's cultural dimensions theory has indicated that norms about online dating applications tend to differ across cultures. A study published in the Journal of Creative Communications looked into the relationships between dating-app advertisements from over 51 countries and the cultural dimensions of these countries. The results revealed that dating-app advertisements appealed to multiple cultural needs, including the needs for relationships, friendship, entertainment, sex, status, design and identity. The use of these appeals was found to be 'congruent with ... the individualism/collectivism and uncertainty avoidance cultural dimensions.'

Popular applications

Online Dating 
After Tinder's success, many others tried creating their own dating applications and dating websites such as Match.Com created applications for convenience. ARC from Applause, a research group on app economy, conducted a research study in 2016 on how 1.5 million U.S. consumers rated 97 of the most popular dating apps. The research results indicated that only 11 apps scored 50 or greater (out of 100) with more than 10,000 reviews from the app store. These include: Jaumo, OkCupid, happn, SCRUFF by Perry Street, Moco by JNJ Mobile, GROWL by Initech, Skout, Qeep by Blue Lion mobile, MeetMe, Badoo, and Hornet. An app with a 50+ score was considered successful. Other popular applications like Bumble, Grindr, eHarmony, chamet and Match scored 40 or less.  To ensure privacy for celebrities, Raya emerged as a membership-based dating app, allowing entrance only through referrals. In 2019 - Taimi that started out as an alternative to Grindr launched a first LGBTQI+ inclusive dating app. The ability to identify individuals with similar interests has given rise to a number of popular religious dating apps including the likes of Muzmatch (Muslim), Salams (Muslim), Upward (Christian), Christian Connection (Christian), JSwipe (Jewish) and JDate (Jewish). One of the more notable new apps in recent years is Michat in has been known to be useful in Indonesia and the rest of South East Asia.

VR Dating 
VR Dating is an application of Social VR where people can exist, collaborate, and perform various activities together. Virtual reality apps use virtual and augmented realities to make the dating experience more lifelike and more effective, as well as allow people to expand what is already possible in the world of online dating.

There are several online platforms of VR Dating. VR dating app ‘Nevermet’, is the VR equivalent of Tinder, where people can search and find on dates. However, instead of actual real-life pictures, users will update pictures of virtual selves and will be interacting with avatars rather than real faces. ‘Flirtual,’ is a self-contained social VR app that serves to match users who then decide where and how to meet in VR. Flirtual hosts speed dating and social events in VR, which makes the dating experience more fun and intimate. ‘Planet Theta’ is set to launch Valentine's Day in 2023, and is considered by some experts to be one of the most state-of-the-art VR dating platforms. Users could meet with the people they choose and go on an experience with them. They could take a walk through an enchanted forest, go grab a table at a bar, or have coffee over a game of cards.

Effects on dating 
The usage of online dating applications can have both advantages and disadvantages:

Advantages 
Many of the applications provide personality tests for matching or use algorithms to match users. These factors enhance the possibility of users getting matched with a compatible candidate. Users are in control; they are provided with many options so there are enough matches that fit their particular type. Users can simply choose to not match the candidates that they know they are not interested in. Narrowing down options is easy. Once users think they are interested, they are able to chat and get to know the potential candidate. This type of communication saves the time, money, and risk users would not avoid if they were dating the traditional way. Online dating offers convenience; people want dating to work around their schedules. Online dating can also increase self-confidence; even if users get rejected, they know there are hundreds of other candidates that will want to match with them so they can simply move on to the next option. In fact, 60% of U.S. adults agree that online dating is a good way to meet people and 66% say they have gone on a real date with someone they met through an application. Today, 5% of married Americans or Americans in serious relationships said they met their significant other online.

Disadvantages 
Sometimes having too many options can be overwhelming. With so many options available, users can get lost in their choices and end up spending too much time looking for the "perfect" candidate instead of using that time to start a real relationship. In addition, the algorithms and matching systems put in place may not always be as accurate as users think. There is no perfect system that can match two people’s personalities perfectly every time. 

Communication online also lacks the physical chemistry aspect that is essential for choosing a potential partner. Much is lost in translation through texting. Online dating has made dating very superficial; the picture on a user's profile may cause someone to match or not match before even getting to know their personalities.

After analyzing a significant number of diverse mobile dating applications, researchers have concluded that most of the major dating applications are vulnerable to simple sniffing attacks, which could reveal very sensitive personal information such as sexual orientation, preferences, e-mails, degree of interaction between users, etc.

Furthermore, online dating platforms are also becoming breeding grounds for honeypots wherein attackers create fake profiles to steal user's private information, one such work studies and evaluates user's vulnerabilities of disclosing personally identifiable information (PII) in Tinder, a mobile dating app.

An issue amplified by dating apps is a phenomenon known as 'ghosting', whereby one party in a relationship cuts off all communication with the other party without warning or explanation. Ghosting poses a serious problem for dating apps as it can lead to users deleting the apps. For this reason companies like Bumble and Badoo are cracking down on the practice with new features that make it easier for users to end chat conversations more politely.

Online dating is stigmatized, but it is becoming more accepted over time.

Data privacy 
Dating apps and online dating sites are often involved in cases concerning the misuse of data. In 2018 Grindr, the first platform for gay dating is accused to have shared data about the HIV status of its users with numerous companies. Grindr recognized the allegations but claimed that it was in order to optimize its platform which doesn’t convince the LGBT community. Grindr defended itself by sharing the data loss prevention of the company and reassuring the users with the public intervention of its CTO Scott Chen. In Europe, dating platforms care more and more about data legislation because of the GDPR sanctions that threatens companies with economic sanctions.

Other personal data are sold by dating apps. The one that is the most bought by private companies remains the geographical information of users. When the user allows localization, apps record them and store them using Geographic Coordinate System. When a data breach happens, geographical information directly exposes users.

As others applications, dating apps can have breaches: hackers have revealed security issues on Tinder, Coffee Meets Bagel or Adult FriendFinder for instance. On the last one, the data of more than 412 million users was exposed, one of the largest leak in terms of the number of accounts exposed. In 2016, the sharing of personal information from almost 40 million users of Ashley Madison by a group of Hackers, the "Impact Team", revealed their real name, phone number, email address, geographical position and sexual preferences. Ashley Madison assured their more than 35 million users that the service was totally "anonymous" and "100% discrete" but they didn't completely delete accounts when users chose to (and paid for that) or recognize that data had actually leaked in a first time. Some suicides have been reported after the leak. Taimi introduced bank-level security to become the "safest dating app" for gay people to date.

See also 
 Online dating service
 Tinder
 Grindr
 Bumble
 iris Dating
 DOWN

References